Leon Mike (born 4 September 1981) is an English football manager and former professional player, who last managed North West Counties Football League side Burscough.

Playing career
Mike began his career with Manchester City. As a youngster he played for England Schoolboys against Germany in 1997.

His first senior experience came in loan spells at Oxford United and Halifax Town in the 2000–01 season. In the 2001–02 season he was part of a group of young players selected to train as part of the senior Manchester City squad. Following a hat-trick for the reserve team in November 2001, he was included in the squad for a match against Portsmouth, and made his debut as a substitute following an injury to Shaun Goater. In the following match, against Rotherham United, Mike made his first and only start for Manchester City.

Mike's performances for the Manchester City reserve team attracted the attention of scouts from Aberdeen, who had attended with the original intention of watching Scotland international Paul Dickov. Mike moved to Aberdeen in February 2002, but was released from the Dons fifteen months later. and ended up with Mossley, where he scored 37 goals in 71 games. Mike joined FC United of Manchester in December 2005, before leaving a year later and leaving football altogether.

Club career
He became manager of Burscough in May 2022.

Personal life
He appeared as an extra in the ITV soap Coronation Street.

He began a law degree in September 2007 at a Liverpool college. His cousin is Adie Mike.

References

External links

1981 births
Living people
Footballers from Manchester
English footballers
Manchester City F.C. players
Oxford United F.C. players
Halifax Town A.F.C. players
Aberdeen F.C. players
Mossley A.F.C. players
F.C. United of Manchester players
Scottish Premier League players
English Football League players
Association football forwards
English football managers
Burscough F.C. managers